Arqana is a European auction house that operates horse auctions including the Ventes de Deauville, one of the world's largest auctions for thoroughbred yearlings, which is held in August of each year in Deauville, France.

Created by the merger of auctioneers L'Agence Française de Vente du Pur-sang and Goffs France, Arqana is headed by chairman Georges Rimaud. The company's majority shareholder is the Aga Khan IV, France's biggest thoroughbred owner-breeder. A consortium of French breeders owns approximately 30 percent with the remainder owned by Artcurial, the art auction house subsidiary of the Dassault Group.

According to the Bloodhorse Market Watch, the Deauville auction in August is the best place to find Grade/Group I winners.

References
 Los Angeles Times article on Ventes de Deauville
 Deauville Sales official website (French & English languages)
 Goffs France S.A. official website (French & English languages)

Horse auction houses
French auction houses
Horse racing in France